Liv Tyler is an American actress of film and television. She made her film debut in the psychological thriller Silent Fall (1994), followed by a leading role in the independent drama film Heavy (1995), directed by James Mangold. She gained further recognition for her role in the coming-of-age comedy Empire Records (1995). Tyler had her international breakthrough portraying an American teenager visiting her deceased mother's friends in an Italian villa in Bernardo Bertolucci's drama Stealing Beauty (1996). She followed this with a supporting role in the musical period comedy That Thing You Do! (1996), and the period drama Inventing the Abbotts (1997). She was subsequently cast in a lead role in the blockbuster disaster film Armageddon (1998).

Tyler subsequently starred in the British historical comedy film Plunkett & Macleane (1999), followed by Onegin (also 1999), for which she was nominated for a Russian Guild of Film Critics Award for Best Foreign Actress. She followed this with supporting roles in two Robert Altman films: Cookie's Fortune (1999) and Dr. T & the Women (2000). In 2001, Tyler starred as Arwen Undómiel in Peter Jackson's The Lord of the Rings: The Fellowship of the Ring, followed by its two sequels: The Two Towers (2002) and The Return of the King (2003). The following year, Tyler appeared in Kevin Smith's comedy Jersey Girl, followed by a role in Steve Buscemi's independent drama Lonesome Jim (2005).

In 2007, Tyler appeared in the drama Reign Over Me, followed by a lead role in the horror film The Strangers (2008), which was a box-office hit. The same year, she starred in the superhero film The Incredible Hulk, opposite Edward Norton. Subsequent roles include the black comedy Super (2010), the supernatural horror film Jamie Marks Is Dead (2014), and the science fiction comedy Space Station 76 (also 2014). Between 2014 and 2017, Tyler made her television acting debut with a main role on the supernatural drama series The Leftovers. From 2018 to 2019, Tyler appeared in a lead role on the Hulu drama series Harlots. In 2019, she co-starred in the science fiction drama film Ad Astra.

Film

Television

Video games

References

Actress filmographies
American filmographies